Qaleh-ye Jahangir (also Romanized as Qal‘eh-ye Jahāngīr; also known as Qal‘eh Jangi and Qal‘eh-ye Jangī) is a village in Zhan Rural District, in the Central District of Dorud County, Lorestan Province, Iran. At the 2006 census, its population was 84, in 20 families.

References 

Towns and villages in Dorud County